Jim Alers (born October 14, 1986) is an American professional bare knuckle boxer. A professional MMA fighter from 2008 until 2018, he fought in the UFC and is the former Cage Warriors Featherweight Champion.

Background
Alers attended University of Central Florida, where he graduated with a degree in elementary education. He began training in MMA at the age of 19.

Mixed martial arts career

Early career
Alers began competing in mixed martial arts in 2006 and made his professional debut in 2008 competing in regional promotions primarily in the lightweight and featherweight divisions in his home state of Florida. He also had a stint in Cage Warriors, where he was featherweight champion. He signed with the UFC in early 2014.

Ultimate Fighting Championship
Alers made his promotional debut against Alan Omer on August 23, 2014 at UFC Fight Night 39, filling in for an injured Tim Elliott. He won the fight via split decision.

Alers was expected to face Lucas Martins on July 16, 2015 at UFC Fight Night 45. However, Alers pulled out of the bout citing injury, and was replaced by Alex White.

Alers faced Chas Skelly on February 14, 2015 at UFC Fight Night 60. He lost the fight via TKO in the closing seconds of the second round.

Alers next faced Cole Miller on December 19, 2015 at UFC on Fox 17. The bout was ruled a No Contest after Miller was accidentally poked in the eye by Alers in the second round and was unable to continue.

Alers faced Jason Knight on July 23, 2016 at UFC on Fox 20. He lost the fight via split decision.

Bare Knuckle Fighting Championship
On June 22, 2019, Jim Alers defeated Elvin Brito via KO at 0:45 in round 1 at Bare Knuckle FC 6.

On August 10, 2019, Jim Alers defeated Leonard Garcia via TKO at 1:38 in round 1 at Bare Knuckle FC 7. 

On October 19, 2019, Jim Alers defeated Julian Lane via TKO at 0:53 in round 2 at Bare Knuckle FC 8. After the fight, Alers stated he wants a shot at the title and wants to face the winner of Artem Lobov and Jason Knight.

Alers faced Kaleb Harris in the BKFC Super Welterweight Tournament quarterfinals at BKFC 10 on February 15, 2020. He won the fight via majority decision.

Alers is next expected to challenge Luis Palomino for the BKFC Super Welterweight Championship at BKFC 14 on November 14, 2020.

Professional grappling career
Alers competed in the welterweight edition of the 2023 Combat jiu-jitsu world championships on Jun 6, 2021. He submitted Bobby Emmons in the opening round with a rear-naked choke, before being submitted himself by Roberto Jimenez in the quarter-finals with a triangle armbar.

He was then invited to compete in the absolute grand prix at Submission Underground 24 on June 17, 2021. Both Alers and fellow MMA veteran Ronny Markes withdrew from the event on short notice, being replaced by Nick Maximov and Adam Sidelinger.

Alers was invited to compete in the welterweight edition of the 2023 Combat jiu-jitsu world championships on March 26, 2023.

Championships and accomplishments

Mixed martial arts
 Cage Warriors Fighting Championship
 CWFC Featherweight Championship (One time)

Mixed martial arts record

|-
|Loss
|align=center|14–5 (1)
|Enrique Gonzalez
|Decision (unanimous)
|Combate Global: USA vs. Mexico
|
|align=center|1
|align=center|5:00
|Miami, Florida, United States
|
|-
|Loss
|align=center|14–4 (1)
|Marif Piraev
|Submission (anaconda choke)
|Crimea Rush 
|
|align=center|2
|align=center|2:26
|Crimea, Ukraine
|
|-
|Win
|align=center|14–3 (1)
|Elvin Leon Brito
|Technical Submission (triangle choke)
|Combat Night Pro 3
|
|align=center|3
|align=center|3:07
|Casselberry, Florida, United States
|
|-
|-
|Loss
|align=center|13–3 (1)
|Jason Knight
|Decision (split)
|UFC on Fox: Holm vs. Shevchenko 
|
|align=center|3
|align=center|5:00
|Chicago, Illinois, United States
|
|-
|NC
|align=center|13–2 (1)
|Cole Miller
|NC (accidental eye poke)
|UFC on Fox: dos Anjos vs. Cowboy 2 
|
|align=center|2
|align=center|1:44
|Orlando, Florida, United States
|
|-
|Loss
|align=center|13–2
|Chas Skelly
|TKO (punches and knee)
|UFC Fight Night: Henderson vs. Thatch
|
|align=center|2
|align=center|4:59
|Broomfield, Colorado, United States
|
|-
| Win
|align=center| 13–1
|Alan Omer
| Decision (split)
|UFC Fight Night: Nogueira vs. Nelson
|
|align=center|3
|align=center|5:00
|Abu Dhabi, United Arab Emirates
|
|-
| Win
|align=center| 12–1
| Graham Turner
| Submission (rear-naked choke)
| CWFC 63
| 
|align=center| 2
|align=center| 1:22
|Dublin, Ireland
|
|-
| Win
|align=center| 11–1
| Martin Svensson
| Decision (unanimous)
| CWFC 59
| 
|align=center| 5
|align=center| 5:00
|Cardiff, Wales
|
|-
| Win
|align=center| 10–1
| Joni Salovaara
| Submission (triangle armbar)
| CWFC 53
| 
|align=center| 4
|align=center| 3:43
|Glasgow, Scotland
|
|-
| Win
|align=center| 9–1
| Marcio Cesar
| Submission (D'Arce choke)
| Cage Warriors Fight Night 7
| 
|align=center| 2
|align=center| 2:27
|Amman, Jordan
|
|-
| Win
|align=center| 8–1
| Matteus Lähdesmäki
| TKO (elbows)
| Cage Warriors Fight Night 6
| 
|align=center| 2
|align=center| 3:01
|Isa Town, Bahrain
|
|-
| Win
|align=center| 7–1
| Noe Quintanilla
| Submission (rear-naked choke)
| CDMMA: Complete Devastation 3
| 
|align=center| 1
|align=center| 0:48
|Altoona, Pennsylvania, United States
|
|-
| Win
|align=center| 6–1
| Denis Hernandez
| Submission (rear-naked choke)
| Ultimate Alliance Fights 1
| 
|align=center| 1
|align=center| 1:46
|Miami, Florida, United States
| 
|-
| Win
|align=center| 5–1
| Matt Kersse
| Submission (guillotine choke)
| AOF 11 
| 
|align=center| 1
|align=center| 1:12
|Tampa, Florida, United States
| 
|-
| Loss
|align=center| 4–1
| Ronald Jacobs
| TKO (punches)
| AOF 7
| 
|align=center| 1
|align=center| 0:24
|Tampa, Florida, United States
| 
|-
| Win
|align=center| 4–0
| Freddy Assuncao
| Submission (rear-naked choke)
| AOF 6
| 
|align=center| 2
|align=center| 4:55
|Estero, Florida, United States
| 
|-
| Win
|align=center| 3–0
| David Gomez
| KO (punches)
| RFC 18 
| 
|align=center| 1
|align=center| 3:18
|Tampa, Florida, United States
| 
|-
| Win
|align=center| 2–0
| Brent Silva
| Submission (rear-naked choke)
| CWFC USA: Destruction
| 
|align=center| 1
|align=center| 4:16
|Orlando, Florida, United States
| 
|-
| Win
|align=center| 1–0
| Brandon Ocasio
| Submission (triangle choke)
| CWFC USA: Unleashed
| 
|align=center| 1
|align=center| 3:50
|Orlando, Florida, United States
| 
|-

Bare knuckle record

|-
|Loss
|align=center|4–1
|Luis Palomino
|TKO (punches)
|Bare Knuckle FC 14
|
|align=center|1
|align=center|0:44
|Miami, Florida, United States
|For the BKFC 155-pound championship
|-
|Win
|align=center|4–0
|Kaleb Harris
|Decision (majority)
|Bare Knuckle FC 10
|
|align=center|5
|align=center|2:00
|Fort Lauderdale, Florida, United States
|Super Welterweight Tournament Quarter-Finals
|-
|Win
|align=center|3–0
|Julian Lane
|TKO (punches)
|Bare Knuckle FC 8
|
|align=center|2
|align=center|0:53
|Tampa, Florida, United States
|
|-
|Win
|align=center|2–0
|Leonard Garcia
|TKO (punches)
|Bare Knuckle FC 7
|
|align=center|1
|align=center|1:38
|Biloxi, Mississippi, United States
|
|-
|Win
|align=center|1–0
|Elvin Brito
|KO (punch)
|Bare Knuckle FC 6
|
|align=center|1
|align=center|0:45
|Tampa, Florida, United States
|
|-

See also
 List of current UFC fighters
 List of male mixed martial artists

References

External links

Living people
1986 births
American male mixed martial artists
Mixed martial artists from New York (state)
Featherweight mixed martial artists
Mixed martial artists utilizing boxing
Mixed martial artists utilizing Brazilian jiu-jitsu
Ultimate Fighting Championship male fighters
American male boxers
Bare-knuckle boxers
Boxers from New York City 
American practitioners of Brazilian jiu-jitsu
People awarded a black belt in Brazilian jiu-jitsu
University of Central Florida alumni